Buforania rufa, sometimes called the rufous toadhopper, is a spur-throated grasshopper native to Western Australia.

References

Acrididae
Orthoptera of Australia
Insects described in 1920